Yashwantrao Chavan Maharashtra Open University (YCMOU) is a state, open university, located in Nashik, Maharashtra, India. It was established in 1989 under the Yashwantrao Chavan Maharashtra Open University Act, 1989.

Academic schools
School of Agricultural Science
School of Architecture, Science and Technology
School of Commerce and Management
School of Computer Science
School of Continuing Education
School of Education
School of Health Science
School of Humanities and Social Sciences

References

External links
 

Universities in Maharashtra
Open universities in India
1989 establishments in Maharashtra
Educational institutions established in 1989
Education in Nashik